= HNLMS Inspecteur Generaal Twent =

Royal Netherlands Navy Auxiliary

History

Netherlands
- Name: Inspecteur Generaal Twent
- Launched: 1900
- Commissioned: 1931
- Out of service: 1947
- Fate: Decommissioned

General characteristics
- Type: Auxiliary ship
- Displacement: 432 long tons (439 t) standard
- Length: 42 m (137 ft 10 in)
- Beam: 6.2 m (20 ft 4 in)
- Draught: 2.3 m (7 ft 7 in)
- Propulsion: Steam engine
- Speed: 13 knots (24 km/h; 15 mph)

HNLMS Inspecteur Generaal Twent was an auxiliary ship used for placing buoys, servicing light ships and resupplying stationary coastal vessels in Dutch territorial waters.

== Service history ==
HNLMS Inspecteur Generaal Twent served the Royal Netherlands Navy from 1931 until its retirement in 1947. After the fall of the Netherlands until its liberation, the ship continued to be used as a supply ship by the German Kriegsmarine after being captured intact. Once the Netherlands was liberated, the ship was returned.
